Longdon Halt railway station was a station in Longdon-on-Tern, Shropshire, England. The station was opened in 1934 and closed in 1963. There were two short wooden edged platforms with wooden waiting shelters. Both platforms were accessible from steps down the shallow cutting leading from the road over bridge.

References

Further reading

Disused railway stations in Shropshire
Railway stations in Great Britain opened in 1934
Railway stations in Great Britain closed in 1963
Former Great Western Railway stations